Micro Transport Protocol or μTP (sometimes also uTP) is an open UDP-based variant of the BitTorrent peer-to-peer file sharing protocol intended to mitigate poor latency and other congestion control problems found in conventional BitTorrent over TCP, while providing reliable, ordered delivery.

It was devised to automatically slow down the rate at which packets of data are transmitted between users of peer-to-peer file sharing torrents when it interferes with other applications.  For example, the protocol should automatically allow the sharing of an DSL line between a BitTorrent application and a web browser.

Development

μTP emerged from research at Internet2 on QoS and high-performance bulk transport, was adapted for use as a background transport protocol by Plicto, founded by Stanislav Shalunov and Ben Teitelbaum and later acquired by BitTorrent, Inc. in 2006, and further developed within its new owner. It was first introduced in the μTorrent 1.8.x beta branches, and publicized in the alpha builds of μTorrent 1.9.

The implementation of μTP used in μTorrent was later separated into the "libutp" library and published under the MIT license.

The first free software client to implement μTP was KTorrent 4.0. libtorrent implements μTP since version 0.16.0 and it is used in qBittorrent since 2.8.0. Tixati implements μTP since version 1.72. Vuze (formerly Azureus) implements μTP since version 4.6.0.0. Transmission implements μTP since version 2.30.

μTP congestion control
The congestion control algorithm used by μTP, known as Low Extra Delay Background Transport (LEDBAT), aims to decrease the latency caused by applications using the protocol while maximizing bandwidth when latency is not excessive.  Additionally, information from the μTP congestion controller can be used to choose the transfer rate of TCP connections.

As of 2009, the details of the μTP implementation were different from those of the then-current Internet Draft.

μTP also adds support for NAT traversal using UDP hole punching between two port-restricted peers where a third unrestricted peer acts as a STUN server.

See also
 TCP congestion control
 Multipurpose Transaction Protocol (MTP)
 QUIC (Quick UDP Internet Connections)
 Real-Time Media Flow Protocol (RTMFP)
 Stream Control Transmission Protocol (SCTP UDP Encapsulation)
 UDP-based Data Transfer Protocol (UDT)

References

External links 
 BitTorrent Enhancement Proposal 29 - μTorrent transport protocol
 TCP-LP
 swift - the multiparty transport protocol

BitTorrent
Internet protocols